The 16th Congress of the Philippines composed of the Philippine Senate and House of Representatives, met from July 22, 2013, until June 6, 2016, during the last three years of Benigno Aquino III's presidency. The convening of the 16th Congress followed the 2013 general elections, which replaced half of the Senate membership and the entire membership of the House of Representatives.

Leaders

Senate
 Senate President:
 Franklin Drilon (Liberal), since July 22, 2013
 Senate President pro tempore:
 Ralph Recto (Liberal), since July 22, 2013
 Majority Floor Leader:
 Alan Peter Cayetano (Nacionalista), since July 22, 2013
 Minority Floor Leader:
 Juan Ponce Enrile (UNA/PMP), since July 22, 2013; on leave from July 28, 2014, to August 2015 due to hospital arrest
 Tito Sotto (NPC/UNA) from July 28, 2014, to August 2015, in an acting capacity

House of Representatives
 Speaker:
 Feliciano Belmonte, Jr. (Quezon City-4th, Liberal), since July 22, 2013
 Deputy Speakers:
 Henedina Abad (Batanes, Liberal), since July 22, 2013
 Giorgidi Aggabao (Isabela-4th, NPC), since July 22, 2013
 Sergio Apostol (Leyte-2nd, Liberal), since July 22, 2013
 Pangalian Balindong (Lanao del Sur-2nd, Liberal), since July 22, 2013
 Carlos M. Padilla (Nueva Vizcaya, Nacionalista), since July 22, 2013
 Roberto Puno (Antipolo-1st, NUP), since July 22, 2013
 Majority Floor Leader:
 Neptali Gonzales II (Mandaluyong, Liberal), since July 22, 2013
 Minority Floor Leader:
 Ronaldo Zamora (San Juan, Nacionalista/Magdiwang), since July 22, 2013

Sessions 

 First regular session: July 22, 2013 – June 9, 2014
 Second regular session: July 28, 2014 – May 25, 2015
 Third regular session: July 27, 2015 – May 24, 2016

Members 

Per party total:

Per bloc total

Senate

Notes
 Currently detained

Current composition

Composition history

House of Representatives
The term of office of the members of the House of Representatives will be from June 30, 2013, to June 30, 2016.

District representatives

 Died on June 13, 2016.
 Died on September 16, 2015.
Abayon was disqualified by the HRET due to electoral fraud and was replaced by his opponent, Daza on May 23, 2016. The Supreme Court reversed HRET decision to reinstate Abayon but the House of the Representatives didn't implement it. 
Reyes was disqualified by the COMELEC and the Supreme Court due to her American citizenship and thus ineligible to hold office. Her opponent, Velasco was officially recognized representative on February 1, 2016.
 Appointed as Secretary of the Interior and Local Government on September 12, 2015.
Pichay was disqualified by the Supreme Court due to his libel conviction and was replaced by his opponent, Ty-Delgado, on May 23, 2016.
 Died on May 12, 2015.

Party-list representatives

 Died on February 8, 2016.

Current composition

Note: Representatives who voted for Romualdez in the speakership election are denoted as "independent minority". One representative who abstained in the speakership election is denoted as an "independent" and is included in the "independent minority" bloc for purposes of classification.

Composition history
Shading indicates party has members in the majority bloc; italicization indicates party has members in the Minority bloc.

In this tally, congressmen who voted for Romualdez are unclassified.

Committees

Constitutional bodies
*Replacement for resigned member Mel Senen Sarmiento (Liberal; Samar–1st)

Senate committees

House of Representatives committees

Legislation
Laws passed by the 16th Congress:

Notes

References

Congresses of the Philippines
Fifth Philippine Republic